The Carlos Palanca Memorial Awards for Literature winners in the year 2002 (rank, name of author, title of winning entry):


English division
Novel
Grand prize: Vicente Garcia Groyon, "The Sky Over Dimas"

Short story
 First prize: Socorro A. Villanueva, "We Won't Cry About This"
 Second prize: Ian Rosales Casocot,  "Old Movies"
 Third prize: Edgar B. Maranan, "Doomsday"

Futuristic Fiction-English
 First prize: Raissa Claire U. Rivera, "Virtual Center"
 Second prize: David Peter Jose J. Hontiveros, "Kaming mga Seroks"
 Third prize: Baryon Tensor Posadas, "Mall"

Short story for children
 First prize: Luis Joaquin M. Katigbak, "Mico and Friends"
 Second prize: Raissa Claire U. Rivera, "The Slipper"
 Third prize: Herbeth Fondevilla, "The Peace Crane"

Essay
 First prize: Melba Padilla Maggay, "Death and Early Sorrow"
 Second prize: Pareto Oliver B. Patacsil II, "Bread and Quiz Shows"
 Third prize: Noel P. Pingoy, M.D., "Becoming a Hematologist"

Kabataan essay
 First prize: Enrico Miguel T. Subido, "Waging War for Humanity: The Battle for Peace"
 Second prize: Monica S. Macansantos,  "My Brush with Eugenics"
 Third prize: Patricia Nicole J. Golez, "World Peace in My Own Little Way, Bow"

Poetry
 First prize: Paolo Manalo, "Jolography"
 Second prize: Anthony L. Tan, "Crossing the River and Other Poems"
 Third prize: Mariano L. Kilates,  "Things of Light"

One-act play
 First prize: No winner
 Second prize: Joseph Israel M. Laban, "The Day Lola Lilia Finished Weaving"
 Third prize: Hans Leo J. Cacdac, "Choosers of the Slain"

Full-length play
 First prize: No winner
 Second prize: Francis Tanglao-Aguas, "When the Purple Settles"
 Third prize: Christopher Q. Gozum, "The Pasyon of Pedro Calosa and the Tayug Colorum Uprising of 1931"

Regional languages division
Short story-Cebuano
 First prize: Rolando S. Salvaña, "Libat"
 Second prize: Sheilfa B. Alojamiento, "Ang Mga Babaye sa Among Baryo"
 Third prize: Ernesto D. Lariosa, "Sakdapanay"

Short story-Hiligaynon
 First prize: Alice Tan Gonzales, "Sa Taguangkan Sang Duta"
 Second prize: Genevieve L. Asenjo, "taga-uma@manila"
 Third prize: John Iremil E. Teodoro, "Anghel Sang Capiz"

Short story-Ilokano
 First prize: Lorenzo G. Tabin, "Puon"
 Second prize: William V. Alvarado, "Alipugpog 1762-1765"
 Third prize: Eden Aquino Alviar, "Salmo"

Filipino division
Nobela
 Tanging Gantimpala: Norman Wilwayco, "Kung Paano Ko Inayos ang Buhok Ko Matapos ang Mahaba-haba Ring Paglalakbay"

Futuristic Fiction-Filipino
 Unang Gantimpala: Alvin B. Yapan, "Apokalipsis"
 Ikalawang Gantimpala: Alwin C. Aguirre, "Semi-Kalbo"
 Ikatlong Gantimpala: Jimmuel C. Naval, "Mr. Doily"

Maikling Kuwento
 Unang Gantimpala: Marco A.V. Lopez, "Bukbok"
 Ikalawang Gantimpala: Jerry Arcega-Gracio, "Isda"
 Ikatlong Gantimpala: Pat V. Villafuerte, "Huling Hiling, Hinaing at Halinghing ni Hermano Huseng"

Maikling Kuwentong Pambata
 Unang Gantimpala: Genaro R. Gojo Cruz, "Ang Lumang Aparador"
 Ikalawang Gantimpala: Joseph Patrick V. Arevalo, "Pagbibilang sa Bookstore"
 Ikatlong Gantimpala: Enrico C. Torralba, "Ang Ama ni Pando"

Sanaysay
 Unang Gantimpala: Luis P. Gatmaitan, M.D., "Tuwing Miyerkules"
 Ikalawang Gantimpala: Neil Bustamante Campos, "Paano Nga Ba Kung Matanda Ka Na?"
 Ikatlong Gantimpala: Michael M. Coroza, "Si Nanay, Si Lolo Ceferino, Ang Lira, at si Eliot o ang Henesis ng Aking Pananaludtod"

Kabataan sanaysay
 Unang Gantimpala: Margaret P. Yarcia, "Kabataang Mandirigma"
 Ikalawang Gantimpala: Lester John Cariaga Lim, "Pandaigdigang Kapayapaan: Kabataan Game Ka Na Ba?"
 Ikatlong Gantimpala: Ivan D.J. Josue, "Mangarap Ka Nang Gising"

Tula
 Unang Gantimpala: Roberto T. Añonuevo, "Estalon at Iba Pang Simoy ng Bait"
 Ikalawang Gantimpala: Edgar Calabia Samar, "Pag-aabang sa Kundiman at Iba Pang Tula"
 Ikatlong Gantimpala: Jerry Arcega-Gracio, "Sinaunang Pag-ibig sa Apoy"

Dulang May Isang Yugto
 Unang Gantimpala: Nathaniel Joseph F. De Mesa, "SubTEXT"
 Ikalawang Gantimpala: Harlene Charmaine Bautista-Tejedor, "Kasal, Sakal, Xenical"
 Ikatlong Gantimpala: Salvador T. Biglaen, "Ang Bayani ng Hannaga"

Dulang Ganap Ang Haba
 Unang Gantimpala: Liza C. Magtoto, "Agnoia"
 Ikalawang Gantimpala: George A. De Jesus III, "Sala sa Pito"
 Ikatlong Gantimpala: Edward Perez, "Teatro Porvenir"

Dulang Pantelebisyon
 Unang Gantimpala: Vincent Kua, "Shashin Lolabye"
 Ikalawang Gantimpala: Joel V. Almazan, "Balikbayan Box"
 Ikatlong Gantimpala: Lynda Casimiro, "Supectibol"

Dulang Pampelikula
 Unang Gantimpala: Michael Angelo P. Dagñalan, "Isnatser!"
 Ikalawang Gantimpala: Jose Dennis C. Teodosio, "Tanso at bronse"
 Ikatlong Gantimpala: Agustin del Mundo Sugatan, Jr., "Fire Crackers"

More winners by year

References
 

2002
Palanca